Qadoura Mousa, also written as Kadoura, was the governor of the Jenin Governorate of the Palestinian National Authority in the northern West Bank.

International profile
Qadoura Mousa was described as the director of Yasser Arafat's Fatah movement for the northern West Bank in May 2002. He is credited with issuing the official death toll, 56 Palestinians, for the Battle of Jenin. Palestinian spokespeople outside the camp had earlier estimated the number as around 500 and official Israeli spokespeople with access to the camp announced it was between 150 and 250.

Death
Around 11.30 p.m.1 May 2012, unknown assailants opened fire on Mousa's home in Jenin, police spokesman Mujahid Rabiya said. The governor left his home with security chiefs to check-up on the security situation in the city, when he suffered the heart attack that killed him, presidential office chairman Hussein al-Araj told official PA news agency Wafa. He arrived at Jenin government hospital in the early hours of 2 May 2012 suffering heart pains, and died in intensive care, the hospital said. Thousands from different cities in the West Bank attended his funeral.

Notes

External links
 Presentation About the Water Situation, given in Cairo, translated from Maan News 16 July 2008
 Workshop in Jenin Regarding the Management of Water Sources, translated from Al-Quds Newspaper, 7 February 2007
 Opening of a Rural Products Market, translated from Al-Ayyam Newspaper, 5 September 2005.

People from Jenin
Fatah members
2012 deaths
Year of birth missing
Governors of Jenin Governorate